TDM is an upcoming Indian Marathi-language comedy film directed by Bhaurao Karhade and produced by Chitraksha Films and Smile Stone Studio. It is scheduled to be theatrically released on 28 April 2023.

Cast  
Prithviraj
Kalindi

Soundtrack 
Music is composed by Rohit Nagbhide, Vaibhav Shirole and Onkarswaroop Bagde. Background score is by Sarang Kulkarni.

Release

Theatrical 
TDM is scheduled to be theatrically released on 28 April 2023 in all over Maharashtra. Initially film was set to be released on 3 February 2023.

References 

2023 films
Upcoming Indian films
Indian comedy films
2020s Marathi-language films